The 1994 U.S. Men's Clay Court Championships was an Association of Tennis Professionals men's tennis tournament held in Birmingham, Alabama in the United States and played on outdoor clay courts. It was the 26th edition of the tournament and was held from April 11 to April 18, 1994. Fourth-seeded Jason Stoltenberg won the singles title.

Finals

Singles

 Jason Stoltenberg defeated  Gabriel Markus 6–3, 6–4
 It was Stoltenberg's only title of the year and the 7th of his career.

Doubles

 Richey Reneberg /  Christo van Rensburg defeated  Brian MacPhie /  David Witt 2–6, 6–3, 6–2
 It was Reneberg's 2nd title of the year and the 14th of his career. It was van Rensburg's only title of the year and the 19th of his career.

References

External links 
 Association of Tennis Professionals (ATP) Tournament Profile